The 1740s decade ran from January 1, 1740, to December 31, 1749. Many events during this decade sparked an impetus for the Age of Reason. Military and technological advances brought one of the first instances of a truly global war to take place here, when Maria Theresa of Austria’s struggle to succeed the various crowns of her father King Charles VI led to a war involving nearly all European states in the War of the Austrian Succession, eventually spilling over to North America with the War of Jenkins’ Ear (which went on to involve many of the West’s first ferocious maritime battles). Capitalism grew robust following the fallout of the South Sea bubble two decades and the subsequent reign of Sir Robert Walpole, whose rule ended in the earlier half of this decade.

References